Lamorne Morris (born August 14, 1983) is an  American actor, comedian and television personality. He is known for roles such as Winston Bishop in the Fox sitcom New Girl (2011-2018), Darrin Morris in the National Geographic docudrama Valley of the Boom (2019), about the 90s tech boom, and cartoonist Keef Knight in the Hulu comedy Woke (2020-2022). He has also had supporting roles in the films Barbershop: The Next Cut (2016), Game Night (2018), Jumanji: The Next Level (2019), and Yesterday (2019).

Early life
Morris grew up in the South Side of Chicago. As a teenager he moved to the western suburb of Glen Ellyn, where he attended Glenbard South High School. His mother worked for the United States Postal Service. He also has a brother, Devon. Before he discovered acting, Morris was a class clown who would frequently be sent to detention.

Morris graduated from the College of DuPage in 2003 where he studied theatre and received the Chris Farley Memorial Acting Scholarship. He also attended the Second City Training Center, and was a member of Second City's Outreach And Diversity Ensemble. While studying at Second City, Morris worked as a server at Ed Debevic's, a retro-themed diner where the servers act rude to the diners.

Career 
Morris appeared in commercials for State Farm Insurance, Taco Bell, Twix, Miller Lite, Las Vegas, 7 Up, Edge, Sears, Microsoft Windows, Chili's, McDonald's, Ford and Hornitos Tequila. In 2019, he became the spokesperson for Canadian based Bank of Montreal and Chicago-based BMO Harris Bank.

Morris started out as an on-air personality for BET, hosting HotWyred, an interactive tech and gaming show as well as the daily music and entertainment news show BET Now in addition to other appearances. Morris also hosted the game show BrainRush on Cartoon Network as part of CN Real.

Morris's breakthrough came when he was cast as Winston Bishop in the comedy series New Girl on Fox (2011–2018).  Morris did not appear until the second episode - originally, Damon Wayans Jr. was a member of the cast, in the role of Coach. However, Wayans' other comedy series, Happy Endings, had already been picked up for a second season on rival network ABC. The producers of New Girl initially planned to recast Wayans' role, but later decided not to recast and instead wrote his character out in the second episode. Morris cowrote the season 4 episode "Par 5" and directed the final season episode in which Winston reconnects with his dad, played by J.B. Smoove.

In November 2018 it was announced that Morris would be starring in a half-hour sitcom, Woke, based on cartoonist Keith Knight's autobiographical comic strip The K Chronicles on Hulu. It ran for two seasons, released in 2020 and 2022, and was canceled in June 2022.

Morris has also appeared in the films Barbershop: The Next Cut (2016), Game Night (2018), The Christmas Chronicles (2018), Jumanji: The Next Level (2019), Yesterday (2019), Bloodshot (2020) and Desperados (2020).

During the Covid-19 lockdown, Morris co-created and starred in the scripted action-comedy podcast Unwanted for QCODE. The 8-episode series revolves around a pair of slackers who attempt to capture an escaped murderer hiding in their town for a million-dollar reward.

In April 2021, it was announced that Morris would co-star in an Indie horror film titled Night Shift, alongside Phoebe Tonkin and Madison Hu. The film will be directed by Paul and Benjamin China

He began cohosting Welcome to Our Show, a New Girl rewatch podcast with co-stars Hannah Simone and Zooey Deschanel, distributed by IHeartRadio, in January 2022. In 2022, he was cast as Witt Farr in the upcoming fifth season of the FX black comedy crime drama anthology series Fargo.

Personal life 
Morris is an avid baseball, basketball and bowling fan, he supports semi retired professional bowler Pete Weber, he also supports the Chicago White Sox, and has said that every room in his house has something to do with basketball.

Filmography

Film

Television

References

External links
 

1983 births
Male actors from Chicago
African-American male actors
African-American television personalities
American male comedians
American male film actors
American game show hosts
American male television actors
American male voice actors
Living people
Place of birth missing (living people)
Comedians from Illinois
People from Glen Ellyn, Illinois
21st-century American comedians
21st-century African-American people
20th-century African-American people